Drymaeus dormani, common name the manatee treesnail, is a species in the family Bulimulidae. These snails were once used to control sooty mold on citrus trees in central Florida.

Distribution 
This species occurs in northern and central Florida, north of Lake Okeechobee.

References

External links 
 https://www.itis.gov/servlet/SingleRpt/SingleRpt?search_topic=TSN&search_value=77015#null
 http://www.blogstaugustinelighthouse.org/florida-tree-snails-arrive-at-lighthouse/

Drymaeus
Gastropods described in 1857